Ivan Stepanov (1887–1953) was a Soviet art director.

Selected filmography
 The Stationmaster (1925)
 The Nightingale (1936)
 The Childhood of Maxim Gorky (1938)
 In the Rear of the Enemy (1941)
 The Ural Front (1944)
 The Young Guard (1948)

References

Bibliography
 Léon Barsacq. Le décor de film, 1895-1969. H. Veyrier, 1985.

External links

1887 births
1953 deaths
Art directors from the Soviet Union